The International Association of Art Critics (Association Internationale des Critiques d’Art, AICA) was founded in 1950 to revitalize critical discourse, which suffered under Fascism during World War II. Affiliated with UNESCO AICA was admitted to the rank of non-governmental organization in 1951.

The main objectives of AICA are:
 to promote the critical disciplines in the field of visual arts
 to ensure their having sound methodological and ethical bases
 to protect the ethical and professional interests of art critics by defending the rights of all members equally
 to ensure permanent communication among its members by encouraging international meetings
 to facilitate and improve information and international exchanges in the field of visual arts
 to contribute to the reciprocal knowledge and closer understanding of differing cultures
 to provide collaboration with developing countries

During the 1973 General Assembly of the organization in SFR Yugoslavia, which took place in Zagreb, Ljubljana, Belgrade and Dubrovnik, art critic Célestin Badibanga from Kinshasa called upon the organization to "move beyond the Eurocentric tendencies in art".

Structure
 President: Lisbeth Rebollo Gonçalves (Brazil)
 Secretary General: Marc Partouche (France)
 Treasurer: Mathilde Roman (France)

International Vice Presidents:
 Firat Arapoglu (Turkey)
 Jean Bundy (USA)
 Chauhsin Chen (Taiwan)
 Fernando Farina (Argentina)
 Juan Carlos Flores Zúñiga (Costa Rica)
 Malgorzata Kazmierczak (Poland)
 Marja-Terttu Kivirinta (Finland)
 Susana Sulic (France)
 Anselmo Villata (Italy)

Committees
The committees support the activity of the association according to their purpose. Each committee is led by a Committee Chair and consists of a variable number of members. 

 ARCHIVES AND LIVING MEMORY COMMITTEE
 AWARDS COMMITTEE
 CENSORSHIP AND FREEDOM OF EXPRESSION COMMITTEE
 CONGRESS COMMITTEE
 DIGITAL STRATEGIES COMMITTEE
 ELECTORAL AND MEMBERSHIP COMMITTEE
 FELLOWSHIP FUND COMMITTEE
 FINANCE COMMITTEE
 PUBLICATIONS AND LANGUAGES COMMITTEE
 STATUTES AND REGULATIONS COMMITTEE

References

External links
International Association of Art Critics
AICA UK section
AICA USA section

Art criticism
Organizations established in 1950